New Street Law is a British legal drama television series produced by Red Production Company in association with One-Eyed Dog Ltd for BBC One. The series was created by G. F. Newman and Matthew Hall, and starred an ensemble cast headed by John Hannah and Paul Freeman. Hannah and Freeman play Jack Roper and Laurence Scammel respectively, two barristers heading rival chambers in Manchester. Roper's chamber works in defence, while Scammel—Roper's one-time mentor—works for prosecution. A large supporting cast played members of Roper and Scammel's teams.

Filming on sets took place at Web Film Studios, Little Hulton, near Bolton. Location work was done on the streets of Manchester, Bolton and Rochdale. Other interior locations included the Bolton Masonic Hall, St John Street Chambers in Manchester, and a hospital in Rochdale. Although the second series did not air until February 2007, there was only a six-week gap between filming.

The first series aired in May and June 2006 in a pre-watershed timeslot on BBC One. The second series was moved to 9 p.m. Low ratings saw the last two episodes moved to a 10.40 p.m. timeslot. In July 2007, the cancellation of the series was announced. This left an unresolved cliffhanger from the second series, with the audience left unaware of whether Jack survived a car crash.

Acorn Media UK have released both series on DVD in Region 2. In Region 1, Entertainment One have released the entire series on DVD.

Cast and characters
John Hannah as Jack Roper
Paul Freeman as Laurence Scammel QC
John Thomson as Charlie Darling
Lisa Faulkner as Laura Scammel
Chris Gascoyne as Al Ware
Penny Downie as Honor Scammel
Lee Williams as Joe Stevens
Lara Cazalet as Annie Quick
Ace Bhatti as Ash Aslan
Jayne Ashbourne as Sally Benn
Don Warrington as Judge Ken Winyard
Ben Owen-Jones as Chris Quick

Episode list

Series 1 (2006)

Series 2 (2007)

References

External links 
 
New Street Law at bbc.co.uk

2006 British television series debuts
2007 British television series endings
2000s British drama television series
2000s British legal television series
BBC television dramas
English-language television shows
Television shows set in Manchester
Television series by Red Production Company